The West Point Cadets' Sword is issued to cadet officers of the United States Military Academy at West Point, New York for wear when the uniform is designated as "under arms," to include formal functions, drill, parades, inspections and graduation. The swords are issued to cadets in their First Class (4th) year, and are returned to the Academy upon separation, although Cadets have the option of buying their saber or purchasing a newly made one. Despite its straight blade and lack of a knuckle guard, it is referred to by USMA staff and cadets as a "saber," likely because the commands for its manual of arms utilize that term as the command of execution (e.g. "Draw...sabers!")

The Ames model 1850 seems to be the grandparent of this type of Academy sword. The Academy added specific heraldry to their sword starting in 1872. Other academies customized their swords, but now only 2 remain. The West Point-specific Cadet Sword is sold only to current cadets and alumni.  The basic cadet sword might not be made from the same materials specified by the Academy and is sold without USMA heraldry, and can be purchased almost anywhere. The basic cadet sword has been or is made in Germany, India, Spain, and China, but not all swords are of the same quality. Variations of the sword are used at Virginia Military Institute and other military academies and schools worldwide.

The major differences between the two can be seen at left for the U.S.M.A. blade and at right for the standard Academy sword. The blade etching can be seen in a photo below.

Wear and mounting

In full dress or while under arms the sword and scabbard are worn mounted from a white cotton sword shoulder belt that is hung from the right shoulder to the left waist, and a red silk sash is worn round the waist. A breast plate is worn centered on the breast. This uniform is formal and is worn on parades and Honor Council Meetings by the color guard, Drum Major, Officer of the Day and Graduation.The sword is also used for drills or less formal military formations, when it is worn on a black leather belt around the waist with a brass buckle bearing the academy arms.

In 1841, the superintendent of the Academy ordered that sashes were to be worn with the sword.
US Army generals continued to wear silk sashes in full dress until 1917 when this practice ceased in the US Army, but it has continued at the Academy.

In 1955, Frederick P. Todd noted that today the West Point cadet officer is the only person in the Army who wears a sword and sash, and is the sole guardian of the tradition.

Design

The sword is based on that used by the US Army when USMA was founded (16 March 1802). The first swords used were legacies from the Army following the formation of the Academy in 1802 and are believed to have been similar to the 1767 French Grenadier Sergeant's sword used in the Revolutionary Army. The first swords procured for the Academy were delivered in 1838.

Custody and control
Swords used at USMA have copyrights and trademarks. They are controlled by the Directorate of Logistics, Cadet Services Division, Supply Branch and Service and Issue Center which now manages the maintenance of the swords, and their issue to qualified cadet officers.

The Cadet Store manages the sale of swords to cadets, alumni members and other authorized Cadet Store patrons.

Damaged and defective examples may be repaired or broken down and the components re-used.

Swords were ordered from the Springfield Armoury until 1920, after which they were subject to competitive procurement.

Models

Model 1802

These swords were issued to cadet officers and non-commissioned officers between 1802 and 1839. There are no known surviving examples.

Prior to the founding of the United States Military Academy in 1802, cadets served an apprenticeship in the field with the troops. After 1802, the only cadets covered by Army regulations were those at West Point. Army cadet swords before 1802 are mentioned in three existing sources:

On 30 March 1800, a General Order required cadets to wear a sword with a cut and thrust blade between 28 and 32 inches long and with a gilt hilt.

On 22 September 1800, the Superintendent of Military Stores, Samuel Hodgdon, wrote to John Harris, a military storekeeper, that cadet and noncommissioned officers' swords should be brass mounted with cut and thrust blade 30 inches long.

In 1801, a set of regulations was published stating that cadet swords should be the same as platoon officers' swords, 28-inch cut and thrust blade mounted according to the branch of service.

Most of the first cadets at the Military Academy were from artillery and engineer organizations, and so it is presumed that yellow mounted swords were almost universal. On 4 September 1816 a General Order specified that cadet swords were to be "cut and thrust, yellow mounted, with black grips, in a frog belt..." These specifications were repeated in the Regulations of 1820, 1821, and 1825.

There is no further mention of cadet swords in the Regulations until 1839, when it was stated that they were to be of the type worn by the Pay Department, which then carried gilt mounted small swords with black scabbards.

Model 1839

The first distinctive West Point cadet sword appeared in late 1840. A small sword with straight cross quillon, shield shaped langets, wire wrapped grips and an urn pommel. 
This sword was made by the Ames Manufacturing Company, Chicopee, Massachusetts. It is believed that cadet swords were purchased by the Ordance Department for the U.S. Military Academy and V.M.I. In any event, cadet swords were inspected and die-stamped with the inspector's initials, the initials "US" and the year of acceptance. Hickox points out that V.M.I ordered the sword before the U.S. Military Academy did, and requested that the V.M.I. sword be marked appropriately, leaving the choice to N.P. Ames. Ames did not furnish cadet swords to the Academy prior to April 1840. The original order for 100 swords was not recorded. Hickox can only show 2 delivery dates to the Academy for cadet swords, 100 on 30 November 1849 for $11.00 each, and another 100 on 25 July 1856 for $10.00 each. Both orders were probably of the same pattern.

The regulations of 1839 are the last to mention cadet swords, when it was stated that cadets were to wear the swords worn by the Pay Department, a gilt-mounted small sword with a black scabbard.

Model 1850

Little information is available concerning the precise pattern of the cadet swords ordered from the Ames Manufacturing Company by the U.S. Ordnance Department and few specimens have been located to date. It is believed that the cadet swords were purchased by the Ordnance Department for the U.S. Military Academy, West Point, New York, and the Virginia Military Institute (V.M.I.), Lexington. Cadet swords were inspected and die-stamped with the inspector's initials, 'US,' and the year of acceptance. This sword was also sold by Ames to other Academies and private buyers until 1923.

The following correspondence was sent by the Chief of Ordnance (Records Group 156), to either N.P. Ames or James T. Ames:

The final Ordnance Department order for Ames-manufactured cadet swords is somewhat confusing, because the original order for 100 swords was not recorded.

The only letter found concerning the swords is:

Model 1872

The first pictorial evidence that can be found of the use of the sword is a photograph of a group of cadets from the class of 1875. It is known that this pattern was not used in 1870, but the exact date of the change between this model and the previous one has not been determined. In 1872 there were many other changes in the sword regulations for the Army, and so this has been tentatively selected as the date for the change in the West Point sword, although it actually could have occurred as early as 1871 or as late as 1875.

The straight blade is diamond-shaped in cross-section and tapers evenly to the point. It has a strong square ricasso, the obverse side of which is stamped "U.S. ARMORY/SPRINGFIELD." The grips are cast to resemble wire wrapping, and apparently the same mould was used
as that for the 1840 non-commissioned officers' sword. There are ferrules decorated with floral scrolls at both ends of the grips. The pommel is an inverted section of a cone bearing an eagle with arrows and palms in low relief on both sides and a scroll at the top pierced for a sword knot. The guard consists of straight cross quillons with eagle head finials on both ends and an oval cartouch in the center of the obverse side which is surrounded by floral sprays and bears the letters "MA" in old English script. The entire hilt is cast brass. The scabbard is iron which may originally have been blued, but which is now bright. There are a throat with a stud for a frog and tip with an asymmetrical drag, both of brass.

There are several minor variations in this pattern. Some are made by private makers such as E&F Horster (Germany), Meyers, Rock Island, Ames, as well as the swords of the Springfield Armory, and are etched "U.S.M.A." in a cartouch on the obverse side of the blade. 

At one time there was an attempt to issue the plainer Armory products to the non-commissioned officers of the Cadet Regiment and the fancier models to the officers, but this was abandoned and the swords were then issued indiscriminately.

Adding to the confusion is a Frederck T. Chatman illustration dated 1885. It shows two cadets, the first in Summer and Full Dress, the other in White Fatigues. Both cadets' swords are well displayed and parts of the swords predate the first orders from 1872 with parts from a model 1839 issued sword.

A total of 253 swords were produced by the Springfield Armory between 1868 and 1914 with a subsequent order for scabbards in 1920.

Armory records show that between 1868 and 1920, the following numbers of swords were accepted:

 1868 -   36
 1874 -   25
 1876 -   28
 1880 -   14
 1882 -   50
 1893 -   50
 1914 -   50
 Total - 253
 Plus 100 scabbards

The Supply Section at the Academy frequently uses parts from one sword to repair another, which is a source of considerable confusion. Peterson on page 181 shows a photograph of Cadet M.M. Kimmel, U.S.M.A., Class of 1857, with a sword of this type that postdates the model by 10 years, and Todd points to an illustration by Fredrick T. Chatman on page 60, dated 1885, showing cadets under arms carrying swords that predated the model by 20 years. The rebuilding of the swords continues today.

Model 1922

At some time after 1922, the West Point sword was modified to carry the seal of the Academy representing the Athenian helmet of Greek mythology, reflecting the adoption of this into the Academy's coat of arms, instead of the letters "MA" on its guard. The seal as adopted about the turn of the 20th century was designed with the classical helmet facing sinister (to the heraldic left or viewer's right). In 1922 it was pointed out that this was counter to the best heraldic usage which places the greater honor on the dexter side (the heraldic right or viewer's left).  The helmet was then turned to face dexter. All swords bearing the crest that have been examined have had the helmet facing dexter.  The earliest examples of these are well made with brass grips. The straight blade is double-edged with a wide central fuller on both sides running from the ricasso to within 8 inches of the point. It is etched on the obverse side of the blade "U.S.M.A." The hilt resembles that on the previous specimen except for the changes in the proportions of the elements, the use of white metal for the grips, and the use of the seal instead of the letters "MA" on the guard. The scabbard is exactly the same except that the body is chrome plated.

The current manufacturer is WKC Stahl- und Metallwarenfabrik in Solingen, Germany.

Future West Point Cadet Sword
A copy of USMA CSB-0146 Oct 2010 which is the new design can be found at the FedBizOpps.gov website .

Sabre
A sabre model was used at the Academy between 1839 and 1947 although for mounted drill rather than for ceremonial purposes.

Private purchase

U.S.M.A. cadet swords are copyrighted by the Academy and are only sold at the Academy's cadet store. Any cadet or alumnus is at liberty to purchase a new sword for personal use.

Past makers, distributors and exporters
 Ames Mfg. Co. Maker, distributors
 Ames, Lilley Company Maker, distributors
 Horstmann Company Philadelphia PA Maker, distributors
 M.C. Lilley & Company    Maker, distributors
 V.H. Blackington, Maker, distributors
 Lilley-Ames Company of Columbus, Ohio Maker, distributors
 E.F Horster Solingen Germany, Maker
 Henderson-Ames Maker, distributors
 N.S. Meyer, Inc. N.Y.C. N.Y. distributors
 Gemsco Inc. New York  distributors
 Hilborn Hamburger Inc. New York distributors
 Eickhorn Solingen Exported custom made swords to distributors
 WKC makes today's West Points Cadets Sword in Germany
 Marlow White is the present U.S. distributors to West Point for the cadet swords.

See also
 United States Military Academy
 U.S. regulation swords
 Sash
 Shoulder belt (military)

Notes

References

The American Sword, by Harold L. Peterson, 1954  
Cadet Gray:, A Pictorial History Of Life At West Point As Seen Through Its Uniforms by Frederick P. Todd 1955 reprint 2011 by  Literary Licensing. LLC  
The Ames Sword Company 1829–1935. by John Hamilton, Mowbray Company. Providence, R.I. 1983.
Civil War Collector’s Encyclopedia, by Francis Lord, 1963
The Ames Sword Company 1829–1935, by John Hamilton, 1983  
Collectors’ Guide to Ames US Contract Military Edged Weapons: 1834–1906, by Ron Hickox, 1984  
American Swords and Sword Makers, by Richard Bezdek, 1994  
American Swords in the Phllip Medicus Collection, by Norm Flayderman, 1998
Civil War Cavalry and Artillery Sabers by John Thillman, 2001 
Swords and Sabers of the Armory at Springfield by Burton A. Kellerstedt
The Army called it home Military Interiors of the 19th Century by William L. Brown III 
Collector's Guide to Ames U. S. Contract Military Edged Weapons: 1832-1906 by Ron G. Hickox

External links
 http://wkc-solingen.de/newshop/uswespoint.html
 http://springfieldedge.com/sword_m-1872.html
 http://ww2.rediscov.com/spring/VFPCGI.exe?IDCFile=/spring/DETAILS.IDC,SPECIFIC=15242,DATABASE=objects
 https://www.fbo.gov/index?s=opportunity&mode=form&id=d3c0796f86ce398aa1ad7b1365cb551f&tab=documents&tabmode=list
 
 The United States M 1839 Cadet sword. Richard Wagner http://www.oldswords.com/articles/THE%20U%20S%20%20MODEL%201839%20CADET%20SWORD%201.pdf

Swords of the United States
Ceremonial weapons